Samuel Thomas Worcester (August 30, 1804 – December 6, 1882) was an American lawyer and politician who served one term as a U.S. Representative from Ohio from 1861 to 1863.

Biography 
Born in Hollis, New Hampshire, to the large Worcester family. His siblings included Henry Aiken Worcester. Worcester attended Phillips Academy and graduated from Harvard University in 1830. He studied law. He was admitted to the bar in 1835 and began practice in Norwalk, Ohio. He served as member of the Ohio State Senate in 1849 and 1850, and served as judge of the Court of Common Pleas in 1859 and 1860.

Congress 
Worcester was elected as a Republican to the Thirty-seventh Congress to fill the vacancy caused by the resignation of John Sherman and served from July 4, 1861, to March 3, 1863.

Later career and death 
He resumed the practice of law and engaged in literary pursuits. He died in Nashua, New Hampshire, on December 6, 1882.
He was interred in the South Cemetery, Hollis, New Hampshire.

References

Sources

External links 

 

1804 births
1882 deaths
People from Hollis, New Hampshire
People from Norwalk, Ohio
Harvard University alumni
Ohio lawyers
Republican Party Ohio state senators
Republican Party members of the United States House of Representatives from Ohio
19th-century American politicians
19th-century American lawyers